Torreya fargesii (Farges nutmeg tree) is a species of conifer in the family Taxaceae. It is endemic to central and southern China; it is found in Hubei, Hunan, Jiangxi, Shaanxi, Sichuan, and Yunnan provinces, and possibly in Anhui. It occurs in coniferous, mixed, and broad-leaved forests at altitudes  ASL. The seeds can be pressed for oil. The wood is used in construction and furniture.

The Latin specific epithet fargesii refers to  the French missionary and amateur botanist Père Paul Guillaume Farges (1844–1912).

References 

fargesii
Trees of China
Endemic flora of China
Flora of Hubei
Flora of Hunan
Flora of Jiangxi
Flora of Shaanxi
Flora of Sichuan
Flora of Yunnan